The 1988 College Football All-America team is composed of college football players who were selected as All-Americans by various organizations and writers that chose College Football All-America Teams in 1988. The National Collegiate Athletic Association (NCAA) recognizes five selectors as "official" for the 1988 season. They are: (1) the American Football Coaches Association (AFCA); (2) the Associated Press (AP) selected based on the votes of sports writers at AP newspapers; (3) the Football Writers Association of America (FWAA); (4) the United Press International (UPI) selected based on the votes of sports writers at UPI newspapers; and (5) the Walter Camp Football Foundation (WC).  Other notable selectors included Football News, the Gannett News Service, Scripps Howard (SH), and The Sporting News (TSN).

Offense

Quarterbacks 

 Troy Aikman, UCLA (CFHOF)  (UPI-1, WC, GNS, TSN)
 Steve Walsh, Miami  (AP-1, FWAA, GNS)
 Rodney Peete, USC (AP-2; AFCA, GNS, SH)
 Major Harris, West Virginia (AP-3; GNS)

Running backs 

 Barry Sanders, Oklahoma State  (CFHOF)  (AFCA, AP-1, FWAA, UPI-1, WC, GNS, SH, TSN)
 Anthony Thompson, Indiana (UPI-1, AP-2; FWAA, WC, TSN)
 Tim Worley, Georgia (AP-2; AFCA, FWAA, WC, GNS, SH)
 Darren Lewis, Texas A&M (AP-1, GNS, TSN)
 Cleveland Gary, Miami (Fla.) (AP-3; FN)
Tony Boles, Michigan (AP-3)

Wide receivers 

 Hart Lee Dykes, Oklahoma State (AP-1, UPI-1, WC, SH, TSN)
 Jason Phillips, Houston (AFCA, AP-1, UPI-1, FWAA, SH)
 Erik Affholter, USC (AFCA, AP-2, TSN)
 Clarkston Hines, Duke (AP-2, FWAA)
 Naz Worthen, North Carolina State (GNS)
 Andre Rison, Michigan State (GNS)
 Boo Mitchell, Vanderbilt (AP-3)
 Kendal Smith, Utah State (AP-3)

Tight ends 

 Marv Cook, Iowa (AFCA, AP-2, UPI-1, GNS)
 Troy Sadowski, Georgia (WC)
 Wesley Walls, Mississippi (AP-1)
 Walter Reeves, Auburn (TSN)
 Charles Arbuckle, UCLA (SH)
 Scott Galbraith, USC (AP-3)

Centers 

 Jake Young, Nebraska (AP-1, FWAA)
 John Vitale, Michigan (UPI-1, AP-2; WC)
 Jeff Uhlenhake, Ohio State (TSN)
 Bern Brostek, Washington (GNS)
 Jeff Garnica, North Carolina (AP-3)

Offensive guards 

 Anthony Phillips, Oklahoma (AFCA, AP-1, FWAA, UPI-1, WC)
 Mike Utley, Washington State (AFCA, AP-1, UPI-1, FWAA, SH)
 Mark Stepnoski, Pittsburgh (AFCA, AP-2; FWAA, WC, GNS, SH, TSN)
 Steve Wisniewski, Penn State (AFCA, GNS, TSN)
 Rick Phillips, West Virginia (AP-2 [OT]; SH)
 Joe Wolf, Boston College (AP-2)
 Freddie Childress, Arkansas (AP-3)
 John Stroia, West Virginia (AP-3)

Offensive tackles 

 Tony Mandarich, Michigan State (AFCA, AP-1, FWAA, UPI-1, WC, GNS, SH, TSN)
 Andy Heck, Notre Dame (AP-1, UPI-1, TSN)
 Pat Tomberlin, Florida State  (AP-2, WC, SH)
 Tom Ricketts, Pittsburgh (GNS)
 Kevin Haverdink, Western Michigan (AP-3)
 Jim Thompson, Auburn (AP-3)

Defense

Defensive ends 

 Bill Hawkins, Miami  (AFCA, WC, SH)
 Frank Stams, Notre Dame (AP-1, UPI-1)
 Trace Armstrong, Florida (GNS, TSN)

Defensive tackles 

 Mark Messner, Michigan (AFCA, AP-1, FWAA, UPI-1, WC, GNS, SH, TSN)
 Tracy Rocker, Auburn (CFHOF) (AFCA, AP-1, FWAA, UPI-1, WC, GNS, SH, TSN)
 Wayne Martin, Arkansas (AP-1, UPI-1, FWAA, TSN)
 Tim Ryan, USC (FWAA)
 Dave Haight, Iowa (WC)
 Benji Roland, Auburn (TSN [NG])

Linebackers 

 Broderick Thomas, Nebraska (AFCA, AP-1 [DE], FWAA, UPI-1, WC, GNS, SH, TSN)
 Derrick Thomas, Alabama (CFHOF) (AFCA, AP-1, FWAA, UPI-1, WC, GNS, SH, TSN)
 Michael Stonebreaker, Notre Dame (CFHOF) (AP-1, FWAA, WC, GNS, SH)
 Keith DeLong, Tennessee (AP-1 UPI-1, GNS, TSN)
 Percy Snow, Michigan State (TSN)
 Carnell Lake, UCLA (FWAA)
 Britt Hager, Texas (AFCA, SH)
 Jerry Olsavsky, Pittsburgh (AFCA)

Defensive backs 

 Deion Sanders, Florida State (CFHOF)  (AFCA, AP-1, FWAA, UPI-1, WC, GNS, SH)
 Donnell Woolford, Clemson (AFCA, FWAA, UPI-1, WC, GNS, SH, TSN)
  Darryl Henley, UCLA (AFCA, UPI-1, WC, SH, TSN)
 Louis Oliver, Florida  (AFCA, AP-1, WC, SH)
 Markus Paul, Syracuse (AP-1, FWAA, TSN)
 Mark Carrier, USC (UPI-1)
 Greg Jackson, LSU (GNS)
 Bubba McDowell, Miami (Fla) (GNS)

Special teams

Kickers 

 Kendall Trainor, Arkansas  (AFCA, AP-1, UPI-1, WC, SH, TSN)
 Chris Jacke, UTEP (FWAA, GNS)

Punters 

 Keith English, Colorado (AP-1, UPI-1, WC, GNS, TSN)
 Pat Thompson, BYU (AFCA, FWAA, SH)

Returners 

 Tyrone Thurman, Texas Tech (AP-1)
 James Henry, Southern Mississippi (TSN)

Key

Official selectors

Other selectors

See also
 1988 All-Big Eight Conference football team
 1988 All-Big Ten Conference football team
 1988 All-Pacific-10 Conference football team
 1988 All-SEC football team

References 

All-America Team
College Football All-America Teams